Mystic Mountain is a photograph and a term for a region in the Carina Nebula imaged by the Hubble Space Telescope. The view was captured by the then-new Wide Field Camera 3, though the region was also viewed by the previous generation instrument. The new view celebrated the telescope's 20th anniversary of being in space in 2010. Mystic Mountain contains multiple Herbig–Haro objects where nascent stars are firing off jets of gas which interact with surrounding clouds of gas and dust. The name was influenced by the works of H. P. Lovecraft.

See also
Pillars of Creation, another noted Hubble image
List of deep fields
HD 93129
Trumpler 14
List of Hubble anniversary images

References

External links

"Starry-Eyed Hubble Celebrates 20 Years of Awe and Discovery" by Hubblesite.org (20th Anniversary collection)
"Star-forming regions in the Carina Nebula" by Hubblesite.org (17th Anniversary collection)

2010 in science
2010 works
2010s photographs
Carina (constellation)
Carina Nebula
Hubble Space Telescope images
Sky regions